The Patum de Berga, or simply La Patum, is a popular and traditional festival that is celebrated each year in the Catalan city of Berga (Barcelona) during Corpus Christi. It consists of a series of "dances" (in Catalan, balls) by townspeople dressed as mystical and symbolical figures, and accompanied either by the rhythm of a drum—the tabal, whose sound gives the festival its name—or band music. The balls are marked by their solemnity and their ample use of fire and pyrotechnics.

It was declared a Traditional Festival of National Interest by the Generalitat de Catalunya in 1983. In 2005, UNESCO declared it one of the Masterpieces of the Oral and Intangible Heritage of Humanity and, in 2008, inscribed it on its Representative List.

Balls
 Els Plens. Documented since 1628.
 Els Turcs i Cavallets (Turks and Little Knights). Documented since 1828.
 Les Maces. Documented since 1628.
 Les Guites (Folkloric "mules"). Documented since 1626 (Guita Grossa), 1890 (Guita boja).
 L'Àliga (The Eagle). Documented since 1756.
 Els Nans Vells (The Old Dwarfs). Documented since 1853.
 Els Gegants (The Giants). Documented since 1695.
 Els Nans Nous (The New Dwarfs). Documented since 1890.

Origins and significance

"La Patum" has its origins in pre-Christian celebrations of the Summer solstice, which were recycled and given new symbolism by the Catholic Church as part of its Corpus celebrations. In Berga, the earliest conserved reference to a Corpus procession is May 20, 1454. The festival evolved and incorporated more elements popular and religious theater in the Middle Ages, leading to a unique combination of giants, devils, angels, moors, and other bizarre-looking characters.

Despite the religious significance of Corpus Christi, and the Patum's descent from "eucharistic performances," in its present form it is rather a show of popular theater. It is unique in Catalonia. Anthropologists and specialists in folklore have been interested in La Patum.

Bruce Springsteen song
In 2016, to celebrate the 150th anniversary of the "old giants" (Gegants vells) and the 125th anniversary of the "new giants" (Gegants nous), the Bruce Springsteen song If I should fall behind, arranged by Sergi Cuenca, was danced by both couples of giants.

Gallery

See also
La Guita Xica

Bibliography

References

External links

 UNESCO page for Patum of Berga
 La Patum website
 Online videos of "La Patum" and other Catalan festivals 

Festivals in Catalonia
Catalan folklore
Theatre festivals in Spain
Masterpieces of the Oral and Intangible Heritage of Humanity